Nwachukwu Frank Ukadike (1950–2018) was a scholar of African cinema and film history, and a member of faculty at Tulane University.

Life
Born in 1950, Udadike gained a BA from Croydon College and a master's in film and telecommunications from the University of Oregon. At New York University he gained a master's in cinema studies in 1986 and a PhD in 1989. He joined the faculty of the University of Michigan before moving to Tulane University in 1998.

Ukadike died on August 4, 2018 in Agbor, Nigeria, while researching and visiting family.

Works
 African Black Cinema, 1994
 (ed.) New discourses of African Cinema, 1995
 Questioning African Cinema: Conversations with African Filmmakers, 2002
 (ed.) African Cinema: Narratives, Perspectives and Poetics, 2014
 Critical Approaches to African Cinema Discourse, 2014

References

1950 births
2018 deaths
Film historians
Tulane University faculty
University of Michigan faculty